This was the first edition of the tournament.
Damir Džumhur won the title, defeating Renzo Olivo in the final by retirement, 7–5, 3–1.

Seeds

Draw

Finals

Top half

Bottom half

References
 Main Draw
 Qualifying Draw

Milex Open - Singles
2015 Singles